Riverfront Park is a public park in Harrisburg, Pennsylvania that spans beside the Susquehanna River.

The park runs parallel to the Susquehanna River between the shoreline and Front Street, from Vaughn Street at the north to the I-83 John Harris Bridge at the south. It includes a concrete waterfront esplanade as well as greenspace on the riverbank first developed during the City Beautiful Movement in the early 20th Century by Warren H. Manning as one of the first riverfront reclamations by American cities. Riverfront Park overlooks views of the river, City Island, Wormleysburg and Blue Mountain in the distance. Riverfront Park is also part of the larger Capital Area Greenbelt and maintains bike lanes and paved paths. Along the park are many statues, memorials, a series of exercise pits, gardens, public art installations, and a Harrisburg Centennial time capsule. Special areas include the Sunken Gardens, gravesite of John Harris Sr., and Kunkel Memorial Plaza.

Festivals and events
Riverfront Park plays host to many of Harrisburg's yearly festivals and events such as Kipona, Harrisburg Independence Day Celebration, ArtsFest, Woofstock Dog Festival, Pennsylvania Pump Primers' Antique Fire Apparatus Show & Muster, and the Pride Festival of Central PA.

Memorials

References

External links

Harrisburg Events

Parks in Harrisburg, Pennsylvania